Gavda Meena is a locality in Hindaun in Karauli district.

References

Villages in Karauli district